The 1974–75 Illinois State Redbirds men's basketball team represented Illinois State University during the 1974–75 NCAA Division I men's basketball season. The Redbirds, led by fifth-year head coach Will Robinson, played their home games at Horton Field House in Normal, Illinois and competed as an independent (not a member of a conference). They finished the season 16–10.

Roster

Schedule

|-
!colspan=9 style=|Exhibition Season

|-
!colspan=9 style=|Regular Season

Source

References

Illinois State Redbirds men's basketball seasons
Illinois State
Illinois State Redbirds men's basketball
Illinois State Redbirds men's basketball